Samanta Poļakova (born 31 March 1989), better known as Samanta Tīna, is a Latvian singer, songwriter and composer.

After having attempted to represent her country in the Eurovision Song Contest seven times earlier (in 2012, 2013, 2014, 2016 and 2019), she won the national selection Supernova in 2020 and was to represent Latvia in the Eurovision Song Contest 2020 that was to be held in Rotterdam, the Netherlands with the song "Still Breathing". Due to the contest being canceled, she was internally selected to represent her country in 2021 instead with a new song, "The Moon Is Rising". She had also competed in the Lithuanian preselection twice (in 2013 and 2017), and in the Lithuanian version of The Voice.

Career

Early career
In 2010, Tīna won the Latvian music show O!Kartes akadēmija, winning the chance to attend the Tech Music School in London, England. In 2011, she competed in the Moldovan singing competition Golden Voices and won the Moldovan Cup.

In 2012, she competed in the Slavianski Bazaar in Vitebsk along with 20 other competitors. On Day 1, she performed "Auga, auga Rūžeņa", a Latvian folk song and earned 93 points. On the second day she performed the song "Где то далеко", and was awarded 104 points. She ultimately finished in second place with 197 points, behind only Bobi Mojsoski of North Macedonia.

2012–2014: Eirodziesma, Dziesma and Eurovizijos atranka
On 1 December 2011, Tīna was announced as one of the singers for Eirodziesma 2012, performing the song "I Want You Back" along with Dāvids Kalandija. The two of them advanced from semi-final one on 7 January 2012 to the final.

In the second semi-final held on 18 February 2012, Tīna performed the song "For Father". However, she did not make it to the final and placed 7th. The final was held on 18 February 2012 in Ventspils. In the final, Tīna and Kalandija performed second. They placed second in the final, advancing to the superfinal, placing second again only behind the winner Anmary and her song "Beautiful Song".

On 15 January 2013, it was revealed Tīna would be taking part in Dziesma, the new title for the Latvian national final, performing the song "I Need a Hero". Tīna placed first in the first semi-final held on 8 February 2013, advancing to the final on 16 February 2013. Tīna was considered the heavy favourite to win the competition.

In the final, Tīna placed second, advancing to the superfinal like the previous year. In the final, she reached second place, behind the band PeR and their song "Here We Go". Tīna placed second in the superfinal, behind PeR once again. That year, she also took part in the national Lithuanian selection for Eurovision in duet with Vudis, with the song "Hey Chiki – Mama". The duet finished 4th of the 1st heat and get eliminated.

Tīna took place in the first semi-final of Dziesma 2014 with her song "Stay", on 1 February 2014 in Riga. She advanced to the final in a three-way tie for second place. In the final, held on 22 February 2014, Tīna performed fifth. She placed third and as a part of the top three, advanced to the superfinal. In the superfinal, Tīna placed third once again, behind Dons and his song "Pēdējā vēstule" and the winners Aarzemnieki and their song "Cake to Bake".

2014–2015: Lietuvos balsas
Tīna competed on the third season of Lietuvos balsas, the Lithuanian version of The Voice. Since she is not Lithuanian, she communicated to the judges in Russian. For her audition, Samanta performed the song "I Wanna Dance With Somebody (Who Loves Me)". For her battle Samanta performed the song "I'm Every Woman" against Monika & Kristina, Samanta won the battle. Tīna finished the contest in the top eight, just missing out on reaching the final four to Agnė Juškenaitė.

2015–2019: Supernova 2016 and Eurovizijos atranka
On 31 January 2016, Tīna was announced as one of the participants in Supernova 2016 with two songs, "We Live for Love" and "The Love Is Forever". "We Live for Love" competed in the first heat on 7 February, and did not advance to the semi-finals. "The Love Is Forever" competed in the second heat on 14 February, where it advanced to the semi-final after being saved by the jury. After performing in the semi-final, she decided to withdraw from the competition.

In 2016, it was confirmed that she would compete in Lithuania's national selection for the Eurovision Song Contest 2017. She performed the song "Tavo oda" in a duet with Lithuanian singer Tadas Rimgaila. The act was eliminated in the first heat of the contest.

Tīna also participated in Supernova 2019 with the song "Cutting The Wire", reaching 7th place.

2020–2021: Eurovision Song Contest

In late 2019, Tīna submitted the song "Still Breathing" to Supernova, the Latvian preselection for the Eurovision Song Contest. In January 2020, it was announced that she and 25 other acts had been shortlisted from the 126 entries received by the Latvian broadcaster LTV. She survived a second elimination round and proceeded to the final on 8 February 2020. She went on to win the competition and was supposed to represent Latvia in the Eurovision Song Contest 2020 held in Rotterdam, the Netherlands in May 2020, but then the COVID-19 pandemic forced the contest to be canceled. LTV, the Latvian broadcaster, later confirmed that Tīna would represent Latvia again in the Eurovision Song Contest 2021. She performed the song The Moon Is Rising, but did not qualify for the Grand Final. It was later revealed that she had placed 17th (last) in the second semi-final, receiving 14 points, finishing last overall in the contest.

Personal life 
Samanta Tīna claims to be of Russian (particularly, her father is ethnic Russian), German, Belarusian and Turkish descent. Although her family started as a Russian-speaking one, she and her sister Sintija communicated with their parents in Latvian. She also dated Latvian singer Dāvids Kalandija.

Discography

Singles

Albums

Participations in Eurovision's National Finals

References

1989 births
Living people
People from Tukums
21st-century Latvian women singers
Latvian pop singers
Latvian expatriates in Lithuania
English-language singers from Latvia
Eurovision Song Contest entrants for Latvia
Eurovision Song Contest entrants of 2020
Eurovision Song Contest entrants of 2021
The Voice (franchise) contestants
Latvian composers
Latvian people of Russian descent
Latvian people of German descent
Latvian people of Belarusian descent
Latvian people of Turkish descent